Hearts on Ice is a 2023 Philippine television drama sports romance series broadcast by GMA Network. Directed by Dominic Zapata, it stars Ashley Ortega and Xian Lim. It premiered on March 13, 2023 on the network's Telebabad line up replacing Luv Is.

Cast and characters 
Lead cast
 Ashley Ortega as Pauline "Ponggay" B. Martinez
 Xian Lim as Lorenzo "Enzo" Razon

Supporting cast
 Amy Austria as Liberty "Libay" Bravo-Martinez
 Rita Avila as Yvanna Campos-Guidote
 Tonton Gutierrez as Gerald Guidote
 Lito Pimentel as Ruben Martinez
 Ina Feleo as Wendy
 Cheska Iñigo as Vivian Razon
 Roxie Smith as Monique Guidote
 Skye Chua as Sonja
 Kim Perez as Salvador "Bogs" Adriano
 Ruiz Gomez as Oliver Ramirez

Guest cast
Elle Villanueva as young Libay
Lianne Valentin as young Yvanna
Jon Lucas as young Gerald
Prince Clemente as young Ruben
Arhia Faye Agas as young Ponggay
Michael Martinez as himself

Episodes
<onlyinclude>

References

External links
 
 

2023 Philippine television series debuts
Filipino-language television shows
GMA Network drama series
Philippine romance television series
Philippine sports television series
Television shows set in the Philippines